Otto Joachim may refer to:

 Otto Joachim (composer) (1910–2010), German-born Canadian musician
 Otto Joachim Moltke (1770–1853), Minister of State of Denmark, 1824–1842